Madison "Maddy" Goli-Tung (née Tung) is a United States Air Force Officer, wrestler, and Rhodes Scholar who was the first woman to wrestle for the U.S. Air Force Academy men's team.

Early life and wrestling 
Tung is originally from Santa Monica, California, where she wrestled for Santa Monica High School and was a six-time All-American.  Coached by 2008 Olympian Marcie Van Dusen, she won a bronze medal for Team USA at the 15th Austrian Ladies Open in 2013, competing at 52 kg.  In 2014, Tung became a national champion at the USA Wrestling Girls Junior Folkstyle Nationals held in Oklahoma City in the 117 lb weight class.

Career 
After high school, Tung attended the United States Air Force Academy, where she majored in Mathematics and Humanities and minored in Chinese.  She was the first female wrestler on the Air Force Academy men's wrestling team, and trained at the nearby Olympic Training Center as part of the National 2014 U.S. Women's Freestyle Team. She was named a Stamps Scholar, a Truman Scholar, a Schwarzman Scholar, a Marshall Scholar and a Rhodes Scholar at Oriel College, Oxford. On May 30, 2019, Tung graduated as a Distinguished Graduate with a Bachelor of Science and commissioned as an active-duty Air Force Officer, and was recognized by President Donald Trump in his commencement address.

Personal life 
Tung has a private pilot license and holds a Black Belt in Hapkido, a Korean martial art. Tung is married to Dr. Larissa Goli, a DPhil student at Keble College, Oxford, and adopted the joint family name Goli-Tung.

References

Living people
American female sport wrestlers
People from Santa Monica, California
Year of birth missing (living people)
American Rhodes Scholars
United States Air Force Academy alumni
United States Air Force officers
21st-century American women
Military personnel from California
American hapkido practitioners